A band may refer to:
 A band (NATO), a range of radio frequencies
 A-band, an absorption band for molecular oxygen
 A Band, a musical improvisation group, originally from Nottingham, England
 A band (anatomy), the anisotropic band in sarcomeres
 A (band), a rock band from Suffolk, England
 A band, a group of musicians

See also
 A (disambiguation)